Viktor Mikhailovich Kruglov (born 19 January 1955, in Podolsk) is a retired Soviet football player.

Honours
 Soviet Top League winner: 1976 (autumn).
 Soviet Cup winner: 1986.

International career
Kruglov made his debut for USSR on 28 November 1976 in a friendly against Argentina. He played in a 1978 FIFA World Cup qualifier against Hungary.

External links
  Profile

1955 births
People from Podolsk
Living people
Russian footballers
Soviet footballers
Soviet Union international footballers
FC Torpedo Moscow players
PFC CSKA Moscow players
Soviet Top League players
Association football defenders
Sportspeople from Moscow Oblast